Apsopelix is an extinct genus of ray-finned fish that existed about 95-80 million years ago in the shallow waters of the Western Interior Seaway, Hudson Seaway, England, France, and Japan.

Description 
Apsopelix was a small teleost, reaching lengths of 23-27 centimeters (9-10 inches). Fossils possess long gill rakers, which are indicative of a microphagous lifestyle, and evidence of a long gut alongside a robust body show that Apsopelix likely fed on plankton.

Classification 

The genus Apsopelix has a confusing taxonomic history, with several genera being lumped into it over time. Fossils of the genus found in new locations or preserved unusually would be given distinct genus names, and the holotype specimen was misattributed as a species of Calamopleurus. The genus has also been assigned to a plethora of different teleost groups, such as Mugilidae, Clupeidae, Elopoidei, Clupeomorpha, Osteoglossomorpha, Percesoces, Crossognathidae, Syllaemidae, Pelycorapidae, Apsopelicidae.

Today, Apsopelix is considered to be in the order Crossognathiformes and in the family Crossognathidae, alongside Crossognathus.

References

External links
Fish1
Taxonomy
Fossils
Fossils2
Information

Crossognathiformes
Prehistoric ray-finned fish genera
Late Cretaceous fish
Cretaceous fish of North America
Cretaceous fish of Asia
Cretaceous fish of Europe